Manulea pseudocomplana is a moth of the family Erebidae. It is found from central and southern Europe to Ukraine, Turkey and Iran.

Subspecies
Eilema pseudocomplana pseudocomplana
Eilema pseudocomplana iberica Mentzer, 1980

References

External links
Eilema pseudocomplana on Fauna Europaea
Eilema pseudocomplana on Lepiforum e.V.
Eilema pseudocomplana on BioLib.cz
Eilema pseudocomplana in France

Moths described in 1939
Lithosiina
Moths of Europe
Moths of Asia